El Hijo del barrio is a 1940 Argentine film.

Cast

External links
 

1940 films
1940s Spanish-language films
Argentine black-and-white films
1940 comedy films
Argentine comedy films
Films directed by Lucas Demare
1940s Argentine films